is a Japanese actress. Amongst her film and television credits are Rinko in the film My Love Story!, Suzume Yosano in the film Daytime Shooting Star, and Suzume Nireno in the 98th NHK asadora Hanbun, Aoi.

Career
Nagano was scouted in Kichijōji, Tokyo when she was in her third year of elementary school. She made her acting debut in the 2009 action-adventure film Hard Revenge Milly: Bloody Battle as a minor character. Nagano was a regular model for Japanese fashion magazines Nico☆Petite and nicola. In August 2016 she became an exclusive model for Seventeen. In 2015 she played the heroine, Rinko Yamato, in the romantic comedy film My Love Story!.

Her first lead role came in the 2016 teen drama Koe Koi as Yuiko Yoshioka, a high school student who meets a mysterious boy who wears a paper bag over his head. Later that year she provided the voice for the character Zaya in the Japanese version of the film Gods of Egypt. She also appeared in commercials for Calpis Water, Sekisui House, Townwork, UQ Mobile, and Alpen. In 2017 she starred in the romance film Daytime Shooting Star and was announced as the lead for NHK's 98th Asadora, Hanbun, Aoi, which started airing in April 2018. For her lead role in this asadora, Nagano was named the Best Actress at the 98th Japan Television Drama Academy Awards.  

In 2019, Nagano acted alongside Masaki Suda in the drama Mr. Hiiragi's Homeroom, and was named Best Supporting Actress at the 100th Japan Television Drama Academy Awards for her role.
In 2022, Nagano was nominated in the Best Actress category for her role in the 2021 film And So the Baton Is Passed at the 45th Japan Academy Film Prize. She was also named Best Actress at the 64th Blue Ribbon Awards for her role in the same film.
She then appeared in the drama Unicorn ni Notte. 
 She also starred in the live-action film adaptation of the manga My Broken Mariko which was released in September 2022.

Filmography

Film

Television drama

Other television

Japanese dub

Music videos

Bibliography

Magazines
Ribon, Shueisha 1995-, as an exclusive model since 2010
Nico☆Petite, Shinchosha 2006-, as an exclusive model from 2010 to 2013
nicola, Shinchosha 1997-, as an exclusive model from 2013 to 2016
Seventeen, Shueisha 1967-, as an exclusive model since 2016

Photobooks
 Moment (2019)
 No cambia (2020)

Awards

References

External links
 Official profile 
 
 

1999 births
Actresses from Tokyo
Living people
Stardust Promotion artists
Asadora lead actors
Japanese child actresses
21st-century Japanese actresses